Work in Progress is a nonfiction book by American business executive and author Michael Eisner. It documents the former Walt Disney Company CEO's lengthy career at various entertainment companies, his childhood and formative years, his life's relationships, and advice he passes on to readers.

References

1999 non-fiction books
American memoirs
Hyperion Books books
Michael Eisner